Argopecten nucleus, or the nucleus scallop, is a species of bivalve mollusc in the family Pectinidae. It can be found in Caribbean waters, ranging from southern Florida to the West Indies.

References

nucleus
Bivalves described in 1825